Luca Ferri (born 7 February 1991) is an Italian professional footballer who plays as a centre back for  club Trento.

Club career
On 15 July 2020, Ferri joined to Serie D club Fiorenzuola. He played 31 games and scored 2 goals on 2020–21 Serie D season, Fiorenzuola won the Group D and was promoted to Serie C.

On 17 June 2022, Ferri signed a two-year deal with Trento.

References

External links
 

1991 births
Living people
Sportspeople from the Province of Bergamo
Italian footballers
Association football defenders
Serie C players
Serie D players
U.C. AlbinoLeffe players
A.C. Prato players
A.C. Cuneo 1905 players
U.S. Pergolettese 1932 players
Pro Sesto 2013 players
U.S.D. Caravaggio players
F.C. Arzignano Valchiampo players
U.S. Fiorenzuola 1922 S.S. players
A.C. Trento 1921 players
People from Calcinate
Footballers from Lombardy